Miguel José Mansur (born 15 July 1977) is an Aruban politician of the Accion 21 party. He was elected a Senator of the Parliament of Aruba in the elections of 25 June 2021. He was the top vote getter amongst new candidates and fifth overall of 176 candidates participating.

Early life and education

Mansur was born to Madeline Arends, former Miss Tivoli 1967, the daughter of Lieutenant Governor (Gezaghebber) Eric "Tushi" Arends and M.E.I. "Betsy" Arends whose family emigrated from the Netherlands in the 1700s. His father Miguel José Mansur, Sr. is an affluent businessman from a well-known Aruban merchant family of Lebanese descent and former President of the Chamber of Commerce. He is the grandson of Elias Mansur, an important local businessman of the 20th century whose family settled in Aruba since 1902 and who was condecorated Officer in the Order of Orange-Nassau. His paternal grandmother was Damia S. Mawad of a prominent Zgharta noble family and cousin to assassinated Lebanese President René Moawad. He is the nephew of former Minister of Economic Affairs and Tourism E.F. "Don" Mansur.

His primary education was in the English language at Seroe Colorado School, later renamed International School of Aruba. At the age of fourteen he went to boarding school at the prestigious Institut Le Rosey in Switzerland where he graduated with the Prix D'Excellence in 1995. He studied economics and international relations in the United States where he graduated from Tufts University. Prior to returning to his native Aruba in October 2020, Mansur resided in Miami, Escazú, Madrid, Ibiza, Sydney, London, Amsterdam and Boston.

Career

An investor turned politician inspired by an article he published during the coronavirus pandemic, "Status Aparte: The Road to Prosperity or Poverty?" on 18 July 2020. Mansur critically assessed Aruba's performance since gaining self-governing autonomy, known as Status Aparte, on 1 January 1986 by comparing real economic growth with growth in the national debt. The poor performance of successive Aruban governments since 2001 prompted his entry into politics, thereby founding the liberal progressive Accion 21 party on 18 December 2020. Following the elections of 25 June 2021, he swore in as a Senator of Aruba on 8 July 2021 and is currently Leader of the parliamentary faction of Accion 21 in the Parliament of Aruba.

Prior to his entry into politics he was President of Capitable, a Florida limited liability company that manages investments in the self-service laundry industry and real estate.

Political positions

Economy/Finance
Mansur campaigned heavily on fiscal reform and is a strong proponent of adopting a Singapore model of economic development based on territorial taxation. He is also a strong advocate of reducing the size and costs of the public sector and increasing labor flexibility.

Humans Rights 
As the first openly gay party leader in Aruba, Mansur and his party unequivocally advocate for equal rights for the LGBT+ community including marriage equality.

Immigration
His party campaigned for the regularization of the roughly 20,000 undocumented persons in Aruba and their integration into the formal economy and society.

Netherlands 
He campaigned for closer relations to the Netherlands and is a supporter of the Landspakket or country agreement between Aruba and the Netherlands.

Social Policy 
His stances are very progressive and his party was the first to include abortion and euthanasia as part of its platform along with the legalization of recreational cannabis.

References

Aruban politicians
1977 births
Living people
LGBT legislators
Gay politicians
Tufts University alumni
Alumni of Institut Le Rosey